A. Vyapalapalli  is a village in the southern state of Karnataka, India. It is located in the Srinivaspur taluk of Kolar district in Karnataka.

See also
 Kolar
 Districts of Karnataka

References

External links
  A. Vyapalapalli listed on Government of India website

Villages in Kolar district